Skehan is a surname. It may refer to:

Allan Skehan (1906–2004), Australian rules footballer
Donal Skehan (born 1986), Irish television personality, presenter (specialising in food programmes), food writer, cook, photographer and former singer and member of Industry
John Skehan (1922–1992), Irish broadcaster
Noel Skehan (born 1944), Irish hurler
Patrick W. Skehan (1909-1980), American Old Testament semitic scholar
Phil Skehan (1894-1921), Australian rules footballer